Uncharacterized protein C6orf89 is a protein that in humans is encoded by the C6orf89 gene.

References

External links

Further reading